Falls of Damff is a waterfall in Cairngorms National Park in Scotland.

See also
Waterfalls of Scotland

References

Waterfalls of Scotland